Bliss was a British music television channel owned and operated by the CSC Media Group (formerly Chart Show Channels).

History

Early History

Bliss was launched in March 2006, replacing The Amp. The channel was owned by British Sky Broadcasting and their sister channels Flaunt and Scuzz were operated by Chart Show Channels.

The channel was advertised with the tagline of "Total Chill-out Classics". The channel played classic pop songs and music from the 1970s, 1980s and 1990s, along with hours dedicated to love songs and power ballads. Every day from 9 am to 12 pm and 7 pm to 10 pm, there was a weekly themed slot, such as Blissful Divas, female artists, or Bliss at The Movies. These themed slots changed every Monday. Throughout the years, the channel had days dedicated to boy bands, love songs, and other types of music based on Holidays, such as Valentines Day. The channel also showed some newer music videos which fit with its chill theme.

For the channel's original on-screen look, the Bliss logo was a gold color with a shine effect moving across it every few seconds. The logo was placed in the bottom left-hand corner during music videos, and the song information was shown in a gold-colored bar at the start and near the end of each music video. The channel's identity was also seen before and after advertisement breaks, when the Bliss logo would slowly come out of an opening flower.

Sky announced in November 2006 that their music channels would go Free-To-Air, beginning on 11 December 2006, and soon afterwards Sky transitioned full ownership to Chart Show Channels in December 2006. Previously, Bliss and its sister channels were encrypted in NDS from its launch, and broadcasting on the Eutelsat 28A communications satellite, which meant that the channels could be viewed for the first time all across parts of Europe.

On 6 November 2007, Bliss and its sister channels were removed from the ex-NTL Virgin Media areas, following a failure of an agreement from Chart Show Channels for the networks to be made available in ex-Tele west areas, coupled by Virgin Media focusing more on their free On-Demand services.

On 3 March 2008 the Bliss website launched, which included TV listings, music videos, news, competitions, and an online community area. Several programs were created for the Bliss website, including welovebliss.com, which was a program that played the most requested songs, as voted for on the Bliss website.

On 12 May 2008 a +1-time shift channel called Bliss +1 was launched. It was available 24 hours a day on Sky Channel 363. On 2 June 2008 Bliss +1 was closed to make way for a 24-hour stream for AnimeCentral, a channel also owned by CSC Media Group. This allowed Pop Girl, which used to time-share with AnimeCentral, to extend its hours to 24 hours a day.

Relaunch and Closure
In late 2008, Bliss received a new look, with its logo changing to plain white lettering with 'BLISS' in capitals.

On 1 February 2011 Bliss launched on the Free-To-Air satellite platform Freesat on Channel 517. It moved to Channel 506 on 13 September 2012. It was removed along with Flava on 21 July 2014.

Throughout November and December of 2013, Bliss became "Blissmas", a Christmas music channel playing Christmas music 24/7.

Bliss was shut down on 27 November 2015, after nine years, while in the middle of its annual run as Blissmas. In 2018, Christmas music moved to its sister music channel, Chart Show Hits (called Chart Show Dance at time of closure).

Bliss removals
On 6 November 2007 Bliss, along with its sister music channels Scuzz and Flaunt, were removed from Virgin Media's ex-NTL platform as a deal with Chart Show Channels could not be made to make the channels available on the ex-Tele west platform. Hence, the channels were dropped.

Programming

Normal programming

21st Century Bliss - The newest blissful songs.
Best of Bliss - A selection of songs from all over the world.
Best Top 20 Acts of The 80s - Top 20 artists and groups from the 1980s.
Bliss Country - New and classic country music.
Blissful 80s - Classic songs from the 1980s.
Blissful 90s - Feel good music videos from the 1990s.
Bliss Loves... - A mix of feel good classic tracks and new songs.
Bliss Loves the 80s - Hits from the 1980s.
Bliss Loves the 90s - Music videos from the 1990s.
Bliss On Demand - The most requested music videos from the Bliss website.
Bliss Rocks - The biggest power ballads of all time.
Breakfast Bliss - Selection of hits from the 1980s and 1990s.
Forbidden Love - The best blissful music.
Here Come The Boys! - The best music from classic boybands and solo artists.
Here Come The Girls! - Great music from the best female artists and bands.
Late Night Love - A selection of slow romantic love songs.
Love in the Afternoon - Great love songs from the biggest artists.
Love is all Around - The best love songs of all time.
Morning Bliss - Classic songs from the last 20 years.
My Idea of Bliss - A collection of songs selected by different artists.
Sheer Bliss - Selection of hits from the last two decades.
The Greatest Love of All - Romantic love songs.
The Power of Love - Selection of love songs.
Under the Covers - The smoothest classic tracks.
welovebliss.com - The most requested songs from the Bliss TV website.
Best of British - A collection of classic songs from UK artists.
Bliss at The Movies - Selections from movie soundtracks.
Bliss Heartthrobs - Songs from popular male artists.
Blissful Boybands - Hits by popular boybands.
Blissful Breaks - Well known music that has been used in adverts.
Blissful Divas - Songs by popular female artists.
Blissful Megastars - Classic songs from some of the biggest artists.
Blissful Weepies - A selection of classic songs.
Heroes and Heroines - A selection of music from the greatest artists and bands.
Summer of Love - A selection of love songs for the summer.
Top 100 Blissful Weepies - A countdown of the top 100 saddest songs.
Wizards From Oz! - The bestclassicalc music from Australian artists and groups.

Christmas Programming (Blissmas)

Christmas on Bliss usually started in the first fortnight of November between 10 and 20 November with the exceptions of two years when it started on the 6th then 1 November. Bliss always changed the programming completely, including changing their title from Bliss to Blissmas.
Christmas Bliss
Merry Blissmas
The Greatest Xmas Of All
Christmas No. 1's
70s Xmas Party
80s Xmas Party
90s Xmas Party
00s Xmas Party
Andy Abraham's Top 50 Christmas crackers
Paloma Faith's top 20 Christmas Party
Christmas Belles
Guess The Year Christmas Special
Jason Donovan's Christmas....
Greatest 70s Xmas Hits
Greatest 80s Xmas Hits
Greatest 90s Xmas Hits

References

CSC Media Group
Music video networks in the United Kingdom
Television channels and stations established in 2006
Television channels and stations disestablished in 2015
Defunct television channels in the United Kingdom
Sony Pictures Television